VSS Unity (Virgin Space Ship Unity, Registration: N202VG), previously referred to as VSS Voyager, is a SpaceShipTwo-class suborbital rocket-powered crewed spaceplane.  It is the second SpaceShipTwo to be built and is part of the Virgin Galactic fleet. It first reached space as defined by the United States (above 50miles or 80.5km) on 13December 2018, on the VP-03 mission.

Unity is able to reach space as defined by the U.S. Air Force, NASA, and the FAA, by going over 50miles (80.5km) above sea level. However, it is unable to go above the Kármán line, the FAI's defined space boundary of 100km (62.1miles).

VSS Unity was rolled out on 19February 2016
and completed ground-based system integration testing in September 2016, prior to its first flight on 8September 2016.

Overview
VSS Unity, the second SpaceShipTwo suborbital spaceplane for Virgin Galactic, is the first SpaceShipTwo built by The Spaceship Company. The ship's name was announced on 19 February 2016.  Prior to the naming announcement, the craft was referred to as SpaceShipTwo, Serial Number Two. There was speculation in 2004 that Serial Number Two would be named VSS Voyager, an unofficial name that was repeatedly used in media coverage. The name Unity was chosen by British physicist Stephen Hawking. Hawking's eye is also used as the model for the eye logo on the side of Unity.

History

The manufacture of Unity began in 2012. The spacecraft's registration, N202VG, was filed in September 2014. As of early November 2014, the build of Unity was about 90 percent structurally complete, and 65 percent complete overall.

As of April 2015, ground tests of Unity were projected to be able to begin as early as late 2015,
after being projected as early as mid-2015 as of November 2014.
On 21 May 2015, Unity reached the milestone of bearing the weight of the airframe on its own wheels.
The spaceship was unveiled on 19 February 2016, as Virgin Galactic founder Sir Richard Branson had projected in November 2015; ground and flight testing commenced thereafter.

VSS Unity is the second SpaceShipTwo to be completed; the first, VSS Enterprise, was destroyed in a crash in late October 2014.

After rollout and unveiling, a phase of testing called "Integrated Vehicle Ground Testing" began on VSS Unity in February 2016.

Test flight program

VSS Unity will undergo a test regimen similar to VSS Enterprise, then will embark on testing beyond what Enterprise experienced. The test flights are expected to be fewer, as Enterprise has already tested the design's responses under numerous conditions.  For each flight test, the White Knight Two aircraft carries Unity to altitude.  Testing began with captive carry flights, in which Unity was not released from its carrier aircraft.  Testing then progressed to free-flight glide testing, and will continue with powered test flights. It is possible that only two or three flights under each regime previously tested will be performed, instead of the five or ten that Enterprise performed.

On 8 September 2016, Virgin Galactic commenced flight testing of Unity with a captive-carry flight.
On 1 November 2016, Virgin Galactic conducted another captive-carry flight of Unity but cancelled the glide portion of the flight because of wind speed. On 3 November and 30 November, additional captive-carry flights took place.

In July 2017, Richard Branson suggested that the craft was to begin powered tests at three-week intervals. In September 2017, CEO George Whitesides suggested that engine testing was complete, and that only a "small number of glide flights" remained before VSS Unity would begin powered test flights. The first powered test flight of Unity exceeded the altitude of all powered test flights of its predecessor, Enterprise.

VSS Unity VP-03, the first suborbital spaceflight of VSS Unity was successfully completed on 13 December 2018, surpassing the  altitude considered the boundary of outer space by NASA and the United States Air Force.

Following its February 2019 flight to space, VSS Unity began to undergo modifications including installation of the commercial cabin, and changes to cockpit displays.  Upon completion of these modifications, VSS Unity along with its carrier craft, VMS Eve, were moved to Spaceport America in New Mexico in February 2020. After completing two additional glide tests in New Mexico in May and June 2020, VSS Unity underwent final modifications to the commercial cabin and in July 2020, Virgin Galactic first publicly showed the interior of the space craft.

Full list of test flights

See also

 Space tourism

Notes

References

External links
 N202VG Virgin Galactic 1 Flight tracking history log

Virgin Galactic
Crewed spacecraft
Unity
Rocket-powered aircraft
Individual spaceplanes
Space tourism
Suborbital spaceflight
Aircraft first flown in 2016
Glider aircraft